Thwaite is an English surname. Notable people with this surname include the following:

 Ann Thwaite (born 1932), British biographer
 Anthony Thwaite (1930–2021), English poet and writer
 Bruce Thwaite (1923–1991), Australian paralympic competitor
 Mark Thwaite (born 1965), English guitarist 
 Michael Thwaite (born 1983), Australian soccer player

English-language surnames